{{Infobox football club season
| club               = Leyton Orient F.C.
| image              = 
| season             = 2008–09
| manager            = Martin Ling Until 18 January 2009 Geraint Williams From 5 February 2009' 
| league             = Football League One
| league result      = 14th
| cup1          = FA Cup
| cup1 result   = Third Round
| cup2          = League Cup
| cup2 result   = First Round
| cup3          = Football League Trophy
| cup3 result   = Southern Second Round
| prevseason         = 2007–08
| nextseason         = 2009–10
}}
This article documents the 2008–09 season of Leyton Orient F.C.

 League table 

Results

League Two

FA Cup

League Cup

Football League Trophy

Players

First-team squadIncludes all players who were awarded squad numbers during the season.''

Left club during season

References

Leyton Orient
Leyton Orient F.C. seasons
English football clubs 2008–09 season